Simorhinella (meaning "little pug-nose" in Greek) is an extinct genus of therocephalian therapsids from the Late Permian of South Africa. It is known from a single species, Simorhinella baini, named by South African paleontologist Robert Broom in 1915. Broom named it on the basis of a single fossil collected by the British Museum of Natural History in 1878 that included the skull and jaws forward from the eye sockets. The skull is unusual in that it has an extremely short and deep snout, unlike the longer and lower snouts of most other therocephalians. Because of the skull's distinctiveness, the classification of Simorhinella within Therocephalia is uncertain. However, a 2014 study proposed that it was closely related to the basal therocephalian Lycosuchus, placing it in the family Lycosuchidae.

References

Therocephalia genera
Lopingian synapsids of Africa
Fossil taxa described in 1915
Taxa named by Robert Broom
Lopingian genus first appearances
Lopingian genus extinctions